The Shiraz Festival of Arts (Persian: جشنواره هنر شیراز) was an annual international summer arts festival, held in Iran bringing about the encounter between the East and the West. It was held from 1967 to 1977 in the city of Shiraz and Persepolis in central Iran by the initiative of Shahbanu Farah Pahlavi.

History

Accompanied by symposia and debates, the festival program included music, dance, drama and film, performed in a variety of locations in Shiraz and surrounding areas. The venues included the ruins of Persepolis (ceremonial capital of ancient Persia), Naqsh-e Rostam, Hafezieh, Bagh-e Delgosha, Narenjestan, Bazaar-e Vakil, Jahan-Nama Garden, Saray-e Moshir and a concert hall on the Shiraz University campus. 

Some of those who appeared at the festival are:
In theatre, Jerzy Grotowski, Peter Brook, Tadeusz Kantor, Arby Ovanessian, Bijan Mofid, Davoud Rashidi, Peter Schumann, Parviz Sayyad, Andrei Șerban, Robert Wilson, Shūji Terayama, Andre Gregory, Ali Nassirian, Víctor Garcia, Joseph Chaikin, and Esma'il Khalaj. In this field, traditional plays such as ta'zieh (passion plays) from Iran, Kathakali from India, and Noh from Japan, as well as R. Serumaga with the National Theatre of Uganda, Duro Lapido & the National Theatre of Nigeria, and Pabuji Ki Phad from India were presented, amongst many others .

In music, Iran's traditional musicians were presented, amongst them Hassan Kassai, Jalil Shahnaz, Ahmad Ebadi, Faramarz Payvar, Ali-Asqar Bahari, Hossein Tehrani, Hossein Qavami and Abdolvahab Shahidi. The young masters included Hossein Alizadeh, Dariush Talai, Mohammad-Reza Lotfi, Majid Kiani, Mohammad-Reza Shajarian, Parisa and Noureddin Razavi-Sarvestani. Indian classical musicians who appeared were Vilayat Khan, Bismillah Khan, Sharan Rani, Pran Nath, S. Balachander, Ravi Shankar, Ram Narayan, Chaurasia and Dagar. Traditional non-Western music, some including dance, were presented from Afghanistan, Algeria, Bhutan, China, Egypt, Indonesia, Iraq, Japan, S, Korea, Morocco, Nepal, Pakistan,  Philippines, Rwanda, Senegal, Tunisia, Turkey, Vietnam.

In the field of Western music Yehudi Menuhin, Christian Ferras, Martha Argerich, Arthur Rubinstein and Yvonne Loriod appeared in concert or recital . The National Iranian Radio & Television Chamber Orchestra was a regular. Other participants in this field from Iran were Morteza Hannaneh, and the Tehran Symphony Orchestra. From the West, Gilbert Amy led the Orchestre du Domaine Musical, Bruno Maderna conducted the ORTF Orchestra as well as the Hague Residence Orchestra, Iannis Xenakis created "Persephassa" and "Persepolis", Bruno Maderna created "Ausstrahlung" based on Persian texts Karlheinz Stockhausen was prominently featured one year, Krzysztof Penderecki led the Polish National Radio Symphony, Cathy Berberian, the London Sinfonietta, the Melos Ensemble, Morton Feldman & the Creative Associates appeared as well as John Cage, the Juilliard String Quartet, the American Brass Quintet, Max Roach Quintet performing together with Abbey Lincoln and the Staple Singers, amongst others.

The twelfth festival was cancelled at the onset of the Islamic Revolution in 1978 out of concern for the safety of the performers.

Gallery

See also
List of music festivals

References

External links

 "Festival of Arts, Shiraz-Persepolis", Mahasti Afshar (January 2015)
 Persian Music Ensemble at Shiraz Arts Festival, 1970 (Video)
 NZ On Screen. Sound the Trumpets, Beat the Drums, Tony Williams' film documentary of the 1969 festival

Music festivals in Iran
Shiraz
Electronic music festivals in Iran
Music festivals established in 1967
Theatre festivals in Iran
Articles containing video clips